Modern-day Afghanistan adheres to the underlying principles of gender that were made during pre-colonial times. And because of rigid cultural norms, there are standards placed upon women for what is accepted female behavior, as well as differences in male attitudes toward the correct treatment of women. Contradictions arise between traditional customary practices, many of which impinge on the rights of women and are alien to the spirit of Islam, the other functioning canon which emphasizes equality, justice, education, and community service for both men and women. Further, the dictates of Islam are themselves subject to diverse interpretations among reformists and Islamists.[1]

Gender reform was central to the contentious issues which brought about the fall of King Amanullah in 1929. In 1959, the male-oriented government of Prime Minister Daud Khan supported the voluntary removal of the veil and the end of seclusion for women. The 1964 Constitution automatically enfranchised women and guaranteed them the right to education and freedom to work.[1]

History 
Thirty years after 1959, women, most from urban backgrounds, functioned in the public arena with dignity, with no loss of honor to themselves or their families. Nevertheless, family pressures, traditional attitudes, and religious opposition continued to impose constraints that limited the degree to which women could find self-expression and control their lives.[1]

Except in Kabul where women under the PDPA were encouraged to assume more assertive public roles, this evolutionary movement came to a halt in 1978. Conservative mujahidin leaders waging a jihad (struggle) against foreign encroachment, both military and ideological, were imbued with the belief that sexual anarchy and social ruin would result if women continued to move freely in public. These attitudes intensified under the Taliban. Mostly rural Pushtun from strongly patriarchal backgrounds, the Taliban projected ultraconservative interpretations of Islam and apply customary practices as societal ideals. In 1996, gender issues were again at the center of heated debate.[1]

Background of Women

Many agree that differences between men and women exist, and should be preserved through recognized standards of behavior. Disputes over the centrality of women in society are addressed minimally. Respect for women is a notable characteristic, and few wish to destroy this esteemed status nor deny what Islam enjoins or what Afghan culture values. The argument rages over definitions of precisely what constitutes honorable behavior for women in terms of modern realities, especially in light of today's monumental reconstruction needs which demand full participation from every Afghan citizen.[1]

The current zealous need to protect women's morality stems from the fact that Afghan society regards women as the perpetrators of the ideals of society. As such, they symbolize honor—of family, community, and nation—and must be controlled as well as protected to maintain moral purity. By imposing strict restraints directly on women, the society's most sensitive component symbolizing male honor, authorities convey their intent to subordinate personal autonomy and thereby strengthen the impression that they are capable of exercising control over all aspects of social behavior, male and female.[1]

The practice of purdah, seclusion, (Persian, literally meaning a curtain), including veiling, is the most visible manifestation of this attitude. This concept includes an insistence on separate spaces for men and women and proscriptions against interactions between the sexes outside the mahrammat (acceptable male guardians such as father, brother son, and any other male with whom a woman may not marry). These restrictions severely limit women's activities, including access to education and employment outside the home. Many are largely confined to their homes.[1]

Such restrictions are deemed necessary by conservative males because they consider women socially immature, with less moral control and physical restraint; women's hypersexuality precludes responsible behavior. Consequently, women are untrustworthy and must be kept behind the curtain so as not to disrupt the social order. The need for their isolation, therefore, is paramount.[1]

Roles for Women During the Feminist Movements 
The status and power of women increase as she moves from child to bride to mother to grandmother. A successful marriage with many sons is the principal goal of Afghan women, wholeheartedly shared by Afghan men. Women's nurturing roles are crucial. However, this does not imply that women are restricted to domestic work. The stereotyping of Afghan women as chattel living lives of unremitting labor, valued by men solely for sexual pleasure and reproductive services is continuously changing after the rise of feminism starting in the 19th century. Among most settled rural families, women participate in agricultural work only during light harvesting periods and are responsible for the production of milk products. Some specialize in handicrafts such as carpet and felt making. In contrast, Nuristani women plow the fields while the men herd the flocks and process the dairy products. Nomadic women care for young lambs and kids and make a wide variety of dairy products, for sale as well as family use. They spin the wool sheared by men and weave the fabric from which their tents are made. Felt-making for yurt coverings and household rugs is also a female activity. When on the move, it is the women who put up and take down the tents. The variations are endless.[2]

Although statistics indicate that by 1978 women were joining the workforce in increasing numbers, only about eight percent of the female population received an income. Most of these women lived in urban centers, and the majority were professionals, technicians, and administrators employed by the government which continued its strong support. A majority worked in health and education, the two sectors considered most appropriate for women as they are extensions of traditional women's roles. Others worked in the police, the army, and with the airlines; in government textile, ceramic, food processing, and prefab construction factories. A few worked in private industry; a few were self-employed.[2]

The current revival of conservative attitudes toward appropriate extra-domestic roles for women and the criticism of women's visibility in public has largely impacted these professional women. Islamic texts do not delineate roles for women. What they imply is open to interpretation. During public displays of outrage at unfair treatment in many feminist movements, they commanded equality, and justice—guaranteeing that women be treated no lesser than men. These educated Afghan women were determined to find ways in which they may participate in the nation's reconstruction according to their interpretations of Islam's tenets—a powerful challenge the nation still currently faces.

Private and Public Behavior 
Afghan women views their sexuality more positively and question male maturity and self-control. In reality, the differences between private and public behavior are significant. In private, there is a noticeable sharing of ideas and responsibilities and in many households, individual charisma and strength of character surmount conventional subordinate roles. Even moral misconduct can be largely overlooked until it becomes a matter of public knowledge. Then punishment must be severe for males and family honor must be vindicated. As a result, urban women are models of reticence in public and rural women appear submissive.[1]

A family's social position depends on the public behavior of its female members. Stepping outside prescribed roles and behavioral norms in public results in moral condemnation and social ostracism. The dictates of society place a burden on both men and women to conform.[1]

Men

Gender roles in the Afghan nation have followed defined paths for centuries. Male prerogatives reside in family economic welfare, politics, and relationships with outsiders; within the family, they are expected to be disciplinarians and providers. The earliest known recorded history from the Afghan people dates back to the Lodi Dynasty in the 15th century were men fought in battles to defend their land, honor their families, and show loyalty. Women were rarely acknowledged during these times because it was believed that women were of lesser importance. Men, during these battles, like the First Battle of Panipat for example, used women for entertainment while they were away. When the rise of the feminist movement was in its beginning stages, activists voiced heavily the power imbalance between men and women. Activists described the hierarchal structure that was set in place centuries ago and argued, not to disregard it, but to modernize it to the standards of today's world. Many openly discussed how societal standards of women have altered how women were to be portrayed in their daily lives and in media.

See also
 Women in agriculture in Afghanistan
 Women's rights in Afghanistan

References

Further reading

Books
 Gender and International Aid in Afghanistan: The Politics and Effects of Intervention
 The Women of Afghanistan Under the Taliban
 Afghan Women: Identity and Invasion
 Women of Afghanistan in the Post-Taliban Era: How Lives Have Changed and Where They Stand Today

Women's rights in Afghanistan
 
Afghanistan